The Judge Advocate General Branch of the Pakistan Armed Forces is composed of Pakistan's Military senior officers, lawyers and judges who provide legal services to the Army, Air Force, Navy, and Marines at all levels of command. JAG branch comes directly under the Law Directorate of the army. The Judge Advocate General's Legal Service includes judge advocates, warrant officers, paralegal noncommissioned officers and junior enlisted personnel, and civilian employees. In Pakistan, the Judge Advocate General can have the rank of Lieutenant-General, Major or Brigadier-General. The JAG is currently led by the combined Pakistan Armed Forces's senior-rank officers that includes the Vice Admirals of the Navy, Air Marshals of the Air Force, and the Lieutenant-Generals of the Army whose names are kept highly classified.

The JAG officers provide legal help to the military in all aspects, in particular advising the presiding officers of courts-martial on military law. According to the military justice law of Pakistan Armed Forces, the JAG's ruled decision cannot be challenged in civilian courts nor the civilian court can interfere in JAG' court hearing.
 Recently, Chief of Army Staff (COAS) General Ashfaq Parvez Kayani ordered an inquiry into an Internet video that shows men in military uniforms executing six young men in civilian clothes. According to the ISPR, the military public organization, the Pakistan Army's JAG Branch's lawyers and investigators will be leading the investigation, and the investigation will be headed by a Major General, a two-star general officer of Pakistan Army. In 2010, after the successful outcomes of Operation Janbaz, and the captured terrorists are currently prosecuted in a military court, headed by one star rank Brigadier.

Court-martialed officers of the Pakistan Armed Forces
Pilot officer Anwar Peerzada - Pakistan Air Force
Major-General Zahirul Islam Abbasi - Pakistan Army
Major-General Tajammul Hussain Malik - Pakistan Army
Lieutenant-Colonel Raja Nadir Pervez - Pakistan Army
Colonel Shahid Bashir - Pakistan Army
Squadron Leader Nadeem Ahmad Shah- Pakistan Air Force

See also
 Judge advocate general
 General Muhammad Zia-ul-Haq - notable JAG judge who headed numerous court-martials of Pakistani army officers

Notes

Military of Pakistan
Judge Advocate General Pakistan
J